Dorset & Wilts 1 North is an English rugby union league, forming part of the South West Division, for clubs primarily based in Wiltshire, sitting at tier 8 of the English rugby union system.  Originally consisting of one league, Dorset & Wilts 1 split into north and south regional divisions in 2004. It had even had teams based in Berkshire participating until 2001, at which time they left to join the Buckinghamshire & Oxon leagues.

Promoted teams tend to move up into Southern Counties South while relegated teams tend to drop down into Dorset & Wilts 2 North.  Only 1st XV sides can be promoted into Southern Counties South, while any side can fall to Dorset & Wilts 2 North.  Each year all 1st XV sides in the division also take part in the RFU Senior Vase - a level 8 national competition - provided they are members of the Dorset & Wilts RFU.

2021-22

2020–21
Due to the COVID-19 pandemic, the 2020–21 season was cancelled.

2019-20

2018-19

2017-18

2016-17

Participating Clubs 
Bradford-on-Avon (relegated from Southern Counties South)
Chippenham II
Corsham
Devizes II
Frome II
Melksham
Minety
Pewsey Vale (promoted from Dorset & Wilts 2 North)
Royal Wootton Bassett II
Supermarine
Swindon II
Warminster

2015–16

The 2015–16 Dorset & Wilts 1 North consists of twelve teams—most of which are based in the northern part of Wiltshire but also two teams that are based just across the county border in Gloucestershire and Somerset. The season starts on 12 September 2015 and is due to end on 23 April 2016.

Participating teams and location
Eight of the twelve teams participated in last season's competition. The 2014-15 champions, Marlborough were promoted to Southern Counties South while Calne, Cricklade and Pewsey Vale were all relegated to Dorset & Wilts 2 North.

Participating Clubs 2014-15
Calne
Chippenham II
Combe Down
Crickdale 
Devizes II
Fairford
Marlborough
Melksham
Minety
Pewsey Vale
Trowbridge II
Swindon II

Original teams
When league rugby began in 1987 this division (known as Berks/Dorset/Wilts 1) contained the following teams from Berkshire, Dorset and Wiltshire:

Aldermaston 
Dorchester 
Devizes 
Hungerford 
Marlborough 
Royal Wootton Bassett 
R.E.M.E. Arborfield 
Sherborne 
Swanage & Wareham 
Weymouth

Dorset & Wilts 1 North honours

Berks/Dorset/Wilts 1 (1987–1993)

Originally Dorset & Wilts 1 North and Dorset & Wilts 1 South were combined in a single division known as Berks/Dorset/Wilts 1, involving clubs based in Berkshire, Dorset and Wiltshire.  It was a tier 8 league with promotion to Southern Counties and relegation to Berks/Dorset/Wilts 2.

Berks/Dorset/Wilts 1 (1993–1996)

The creation of National League 5 South for the 1993–94 season meant that Berks/Dorset/Wilts 1 dropped to become a tier 9 league.  Promotion continued to Southern Counties and relegation to Berks/Dorset/Wilts 2.

Berks/Dorset/Wilts 1 (1996–2000)

The cancellation of National League 5 South at the end of the 1995–96 season meant that Berks/Dorset/Wilts 1 reverted to being a tier 8 league.  Further restructuring meant that promotion was now to Southern Counties South, while relegation continued to Berks/Dorset/Wilts 2.

Dorset & Wilts 1 (2000–2004)

At the end of the 1999–2000 season the division became known as Dorset & Wilts 1 following the departure of Berkshire clubs to join the Bucks & Oxon leagues.  It remained a tier 8 league with promotion to Southern Counties South and relegation to either Dorset & Wilts 2 North or Dorset & Wilts 2 South (both formerly part of Berks/Dorset/Wilts 2).

Dorset & Wilts 1 North (2004–2009)

Ahead of the 2004–05 season, local league restructuring saw Dorset & Wilts 1 split into two tier 8 regional divisions - Dorset & Wilts 1 North and Dorset & Wilts 1 South.  Promotion continued to Southern Counties South, while relegation was now to Dorset & Wilts 2 North.

Dorset & Wilts 1 North (2009–present)

Despite widespread restructuring by the RFU at the end of the 2008–09 season, Dorset & Wilts 1 North remained a tier 8 league, with promotion continuing to Southern Counties South and relegation to Dorset & Wilts 2 North.

Number of league titles

Bradford-on-Avon (3)
Corsham (3)
Bracknell (2)
Chippenham II (2)
Combe Down (2)
Devizes (2)
Marlborough (2)
Sherborne (2) 
Swindon (2)
Avonvale (1)
Blandford (1)
Dorchester (1)
Frome (1) 
Ivel Barbarians (1)
Melksham (1)
Royal Wootton Bassett (1)
Supermarine (1) 
Swanage & Wareham (1)
Tadley (1)
Trowbridge (1)
Westbury
Weymouth (1)

Notes

See also 
 South West Division RFU
 Dorset & Wilts RFU
 English rugby union system
 Rugby union in England

References 

8
Rugby union in Dorset
Rugby union in Wiltshire